MacArthur Center is a shopping mall in Norfolk, Virginia, in the center of the Hampton Roads metropolitan area. Built by the Taubman Company, the mall is owned by Starwood Capital Group since October 2014.
The mall currently features a large Dillard's which is also a regional flagship.

Mall history
Plans were first announced in June 1994. The original mall was intended to have Macy's, who had signed a letter of interest during the early stages of development for the property.

The 140-store mall opened on March 12, 1999, with the region's first Nordstrom department store as well as a Dillards and over 70 new-to-market stores. The mall was notable for having stores that could not be found across the rest of the Hampton Roads Region.

Some notable opening day tenants included Rainforest Cafe, Restoration Hardware, Abercrombie and Fitch, United Colors of Benetton, Discovery Channel Store, and a Jeepers indoor amusement park.

The  mall is adjacent to the General Douglas MacArthur Memorial. The mall currently maintains the  East Coast flagship store for Dillard's .

The late 2010s saw multiple classic chain anchors retreat from brick and mortar after being challenged by digital retailers in recent years. Multiple shootings that occurred at the mall also lead to the mall decreasing in popularity.

In 2019 During a wave of store closures, it was announced Nordstrom would be closing their location at the mall.

In 2018 and 2019, J Crew ,Fossil, Yankee Candle, Banana Republic, Williams Sonoma, Pottery Barn, Eddie Bauer, Charlotte Russe, Forever 21, Brighton Collectables, Chicos, Zales and many other stores announced their closure at the mall following the departure of Nordstrom.

In 2019 Gameworks announced it would open a storefront in MacArthur Center the spring of 2020. 

In March 2020, MacArthur Center closed due to the COVID-19 pandemic.  The mall later reopened for business at 11am on May 21, 2020.

Primarily due to impacts the COVID-19 pandemic, Express, Victorias Secret, Talbots, Abercrombie and Fitch, Papyrus, Francescas, The Walking Company, Justice, J Jill, New York & Company, and others closed at the mall.

After Starwood Capital Group defaulted on a $750,000,000 loan for the mall, management was temporarily handed over to JLL until Spinoso Real Estate Group began managing the mall in 2021.

In March 2021 the city of Norfolk announced plans to tear down the mall by 2030 to make room for new developments. The mall will continue to operate normally until then.

In May of 2021, Apple announced they would be closing their Macarthur Center location leaving the Lynnhaven Mall location as the only store in the Hampton Roads area.

Following a shooting in April 2022, Texas De Brazil closed its location at the mall.

In December of 2022, Barnes & Noble closed at the mall leaving another large anchor space vacant.

The Mall currently has around 75 stores and services with space for 140.

MacArthur on Ice
Every winter since 2005, MacArthur Center has operated a  ice skating rink on the property.

References

External links

Downtown Norfolk, Virginia
Economy of Norfolk, Virginia
Shopping malls in Virginia
Buildings and structures in Norfolk, Virginia
Tourist attractions in Norfolk, Virginia
Shopping malls established in 1999
1999 establishments in Virginia